The Yamaha YMF278B, also known as the OPL4 (OPL is an acronym for FM Operator Type-L), is a sound chip that incorporates both FM synthesis and sample-based synthesis (often incorrectly called "wavetable synthesis") by Yamaha.

Sample-based synthesis component

The sample synthesis part is based on pulse-code modulation (PCM). It features:
 Up to 24 simultaneous sounds (voices)
 Output sampling frequency of 44.1 kHz (it can also accept 22.05-kHz samples – they are up-sampled to 44.1 kHz before output)
 Waveform data lengths of 8, 12, or 16 bits
 Stereo output (with a 4-bit/16-level pan for each voice)
The PCM synthesizer part accepts:
 Up to 4 MB of external memory for wave data
 Up to 512 samples
 External ROM or SRAM memory. If SRAM is connected, then wave data can be downloaded from the OPL4.
 Chip select signals for 128 KB, 512 KB, 1 MB, or 2 MB memory can be output.

Frequency modulation synthesis component

The FM part is essentially a YMF262 (OPL3) block; thus, it is also backwards-compatible with the YM3526 (OPL) and the YM3812 (OPL2). Like the OPL3, it can operate in one of four ways:
 18 two-operator FM channels
 6 four-operator FM channels + 6 two-operator FM channels
 15 two-operator FM channels + 5 FM drums
 6 four-operator FM channels + 3 two-operator FM channels + 5 FM drums
Four-operator FM allows more complex sounds but reduces polyphony.

Eight waveforms are available for the FM synthesis:
 simple sine
 half sine
 absolute sine
 quarter sine (pseudo-sawtooth)
 alternating sine
 "camel" sine
 square
 logarithmic sawtooth

Unlike the OPL3, which has four channels for sound output, the OPL4 features six channels.

Connectivity

For ROM wave data access, the Yamaha YRW801 2MB ROM chip can be connected to the OPL4. It holds approximately 330 samples, mostly 22.05-kHz 12-bit samples with some drums at 44.1 kHz. It is compatible with the General MIDI standard (128 melody sounds, 47 percussion sounds).

For sound effects, the OPL4 can be connected to the Yamaha YSS225 effects processor (EP), which adds various sound effects.

Like all its predecessors, the OPL4 outputs audio in digital-I/O form, thus requiring an external DAC chip. For this purpose, the Yamaha YAC513 DAC was designed.

Variants

YMW258-F (Sega MultiPCM)

A stripped-down version of the YMF278B (removing the FM synthesis section) was built for Sega as the MultiPCM. Yamaha internally identifies the chip as the YMW258-F, also known as the GEW8, or FA1005, whereas Sega uses the part number 315-5560. This version of the chip was used in conjunction with the YM3438 which provided sound timer controls.

The YMW258-F is capable of producing up to 28 channels of both FM synthesis and Advanced Wave Memory (AWM) sampling. It supports sampling rates up to 44.1 kHz and supports 16-bit audio.

Applications

The YMF278B was used in the Moonsound MSX sound card and in Yamaha's SoundEdge sound card for IBM PC and compatibles.

As with the YMW258-F, it is used in various Yamaha electronic musical instruments, including the Yamaha MU5 and TG-100 sound modules, Yamaha Portasound electronic keyboards (PSS-51, PSR-200, PSR-210, PSR-215, PSR-300, PSR-310, PSR-400, PSR-410, PSR-500, PSR-510 and PSR-600), QR-10 music accompaniment player, and QY-20 music workstation.

See also 
List of sound chips
Yamaha OPL

References

 OPL4 YMF278B Application Manual

External links
 MoonSound technical documentation
 The Ultimate MSX FAQ – Moonsound
 Yamaha SoundEdge Owner's Manual

YMF278